Park Frame (1889–1943) was an American actor and film director of the silent era.

Selected filmography

Director
 The Pagan God (1919)
 The Gray Wolf's Ghost (1919)
 The Man Who Turned White (1919)
 For a Woman's Honor (1919)
 The Forgotten Woman (1921)
 Looped for Life (1924)
 The Drug Store Cowboy (1925)

Assistant director
 7th Heaven (1927)
 High School Hero (1927)
 Road House (1928)

Actor
 Flashing Spurs (1924)
 The Train Wreckers (1927)

References

Bibliography
 Golden, Eve. John Gilbert: The Last of the Silent Film Stars. University Press of Kentucky, 2013.

External links

1889 births
1943 deaths
American film directors
People from Seattle